Cathorops fuerthii, the Congo sea catfish, is a species of sea catfish. It is found in muddy and brackish waters at depths down to 20 m in the eastern Pacific from Mexico to Ecuador. Maximum recorded body length is 28 cm.

References

Ariidae
Fish described in 1876
Taxa named by Franz Steindachner